Leonid Khokhlov (born June 16, 1980) is a Russian former swimmer, who specialized in sprint freestyle events. He represented Russia at the 2000 Summer Olympics, and later earned a bronze medal in the freestyle relay at the 2002 FINA Short Course World Championships.

Khokhlov competed only in the men's 4 × 100 m freestyle relay at the 2000 Summer Olympics in Sydney. On the first night of the Games, the Russians were disqualified from the championship final because of an early relay launch from Andrey Kapralov on the lead-off leg. Teaming with Kapralov, Denis Pimankov, and sport legend Alexander Popov on the morning prelims, Khokhlov swam a second leg and recorded a split of 51.02 to post a sixth-seeded time of 3:19.70 for the Russian squad.

At the 2002 FINA Short Course World Championships in Moscow, Khokhlov enjoyed the race of his life in front of a Russian crowd as he shared bronze medals with Kapralov, Pimankov, and Popov in the 4 × 100 m freestyle relay with a time of 3:11.24.

References

1980 births
Living people
Russian male freestyle swimmers
Olympic swimmers of Russia
Swimmers at the 2000 Summer Olympics
Sportspeople from Ulyanovsk
Medalists at the FINA World Swimming Championships (25 m)